Founded in 1997 by AOL co-founder Steve Case and his wife Jean Case, the Case Foundation invests in individuals, nonprofits, and social enterprises aiming to connect people, increase giving, and catalyze civic action.

Echoing the foundation's deep involvement in volunteering and civic engagement, CEO Jean Case also serves as chair of the President's Council on Service and Civic Participation, which is working to expand business employees' pro bono service to nonprofit organizations in need of those services.

Partners 

Some of the foundation's current grantees include PlayPumps International, a nonprofit focused on improving the lives of children and their families through an innovative system that provides clean drinking water to rural African villages; City Year Washington, DC, an AmeriCorps organization that provides full-time, year-long service opportunities for young people through such initiatives as the Young Heroes service-learning program; Accelerate Brain Cancer Cure (ABC2), a nonprofit that incorporates an entrepreneurial, venture capital approach and new forms of collaboration to hasten the discovery of a cure for brain cancer; America's Promise, an alliance of organizations serving children and youth; the Buxton Initiative, a nonprofit focused on fostering understanding among people from different faiths and world views through friendship and dialog; and many other local, national, and international organizations.
   
Past foundation grantees and initiatives have included PowerUP, the Boys & Girls Clubs of America, Habitat for Humanity, MissionFish and Special Olympics.

Initiatives 

In 2007, the Case Foundation launched the Make It Your Own Awards, an online grants program that involved the public in decision making and design, and used online tools to empower applicants to raise funds and connect with supporters.

The foundation's 2007-2008 Giving Challenge—launched in partnership with Parade Magazine, Facebook, GlobalGiving, and Network for Good—empowered people to use technology to improve their giving experience, support the causes they care about, and encourage others to give.

Social CitizensBETA, a discussion paper released by the foundation in 2008, explores the potential impact of the Millennial Generation on the civic landscape and encourages feedback and discussion on the Social Citizens Blog.

Studies 
 Teens Speak Up – 2011, in partnership with the Boys & Girls Clubs of America and Nickelodeon
 How Giving Contests Can Strengthen Nonprofits and Communities- 2011
 Your Virtual Seat Awaits: Key Takeaways from Planning and Executing a Virtual Convening – June 2011
 The Giving Challenge 2009: Assessment and Reflection Report – 2009
 Promoting Innovation: Prizes, Challenges and Open Grantmaking
 Citizen-Centered Solutions: Lessons in Leveraging Public Participation from the Make It Your Own Awards – 2007
 An Inequitable Invitation to Citizenship: Non-College-Bound Youth and Civic Engagement
 All Volunteer Force

References

External links
 The Case Foundation - official site

Foundations based in the United States